Quentin Halys and Tristan Lamasine were the defending champions but chose not to defend their title.

Andre Begemann and David Pel won the title after defeating Lloyd Glasspool and Alex Lawson 5–7, 7–6(7–2), [10–4] in the final.

Seeds

Draw

References

External links
 Main draw

Wolffkran Open - Doubles
2020 Doubles